Ringer Valley is a hanging valley  long between Kuivinen Ridge and Stone Ridge in Saint Johns Range, Victoria Land. The lower and middle portion of the valley is occupied by Ringer Glacier, which flows north to Miller Glacier; the upper (south) portion is mostly ice free. It was named by the Advisory Committee on Antarctic Names in 2005 in association with Ringer Glacier and The Ringer.

References
 

Valleys of Victoria Land
Scott Coast